Stefano Napolitano was the defending champion but lost in the second round to Matteo Donati.

Lorenzo Sonego won the title after defeating Tim Pütz 6–4, 6–4 in the final.

Seeds

Draw

Finals

Top half

Bottom half

References
Main Draw
Qualifying Draw

Sparkassen ATP Challenger - Singles
2017 Singles